The Guided Missile Launching System (GMLS) is a device for launching guided missiles, and is found on many U.S. Navy ships. This list includes all launchers that are part of the designation series. Included on this list are missile launchers that have not been adopted for service in the United States Navy.

Launchers by designation

References

 Federation of American Scientists - US Navy Shipboard Combat Systems

Ship-based missile launchers
Naval guided missile launch systems of the United States
Guided missile